The Whoreshoes was an all-female, honky tonk/bluegrass/country band based in the San Francisco Bay area.  The group's name is primarily a pun based on horseshoes. They have played internationally in countries such as Belgium and The Netherlands.  In addition they performed at the 2007 Hardly Strictly Bluegrass Festival is San Francisco's Golden Gate Park. On February 12, 2009, they gave their final show and have since gone their separate ways.

The Whoreshoes main influences include country legends Loretta Lynn, Dolly Parton, The Carter Family, Stanley Brothers, Louvin Brothers, Doc Boggs, and alternative country acts such as Hank III, Meat Purveyors, Old Crow Medicine Show, and Lucinda Williams.

Members and Instrument
Diana Greenberg - bass, fiddle
Lala Hulse - lapsteel, banjo, guitar, vocals
Camilla Lincoln - banjo, piano, spoons, ukulele, vocals, washboard
Joni Rueter - accordion, fiddle, guitar, mandolin, vocals
Emily Stucky - guitar, old time banjo, mandolin, spoons, vocals
Eve Bekker- mandolin, vocals

Discography
The Whoreshoes (2005)
Get Lucky (2006)

References

External links
Official site
Official MySpace page
Official Flickr page

All-female bands
American folk musical groups
Country music groups from California
Musical groups from San Francisco